Sona Ayyub gizi Mustafayeva (Baghirova) (June 22, 1916 — 1999) was an Azerbaijani vocalist-actress. She was awarded the title Honored Artist of the Azerbaijan SSR.

Biography 
Sona Mustafayeva was born on June 22, 1916 in Baku. From 1930 she performed as a soloist at the Azerbaijan State Opera and Ballet Theater.

Sona Mustafayeva, who had a lyrical soprano voice, helped the troupe for about a year by invitation when the Azerbaijan State Theatre of Musical Comedy began operating as an independent theater in 1938. Here she performed the parts of Gulchohra and Gulnaz ("Arshin Mal Alan" and "Mashadi Ibad", Uzeyir Hajibeyov).

S. Mustafayeva died in 1999 in Baku.

Awards 
 Honored Artist of the Azerbaijan SSR — June 17, 1943

Main roles

References

Literature 
 
 

20th-century Azerbaijani actresses
1916 births
1999 deaths
Soviet actresses
Soviet sopranos
Honored Artists of the Azerbaijan SSR